Alexander Yaroslavich Nevsky (13 May 1221 – 14 November 1263) served as Prince of Novgorod (1236–40, 1241–56 and 1258–1259), Grand Prince of Kiev (1246–63) and Grand Prince of Vladimir (1252–63) during some of the most difficult times in Kievan Rus' history.

Commonly regarded as a key figure of medieval Rus', Alexander was a grandson of Vsevolod the Big Nest and rose to legendary status on account of his military victories over German and Swedish invaders. He preserved separate statehood and Orthodoxy, agreeing to pay tribute to the powerful Golden Horde. Metropolitan Macarius of Moscow canonized Alexander Nevsky as a saint of the Russian Orthodox Church in 1547.

Early life 
From Tales of the Life and Courage of the Pious and Great Prince Alexander found in the Second Pskovian Chronicle, circa 1260–1280, comes one of the first known references to the Great Prince:

"By the will of God, prince Alexander was born from the
charitable, people-loving, and meek the Great Prince Yaroslav, and
his mother was Theodosia. As it was told by the prophet Isaiah:
'Thus sayeth the Lord: I appoint the princes because they are
sacred and I direct them.'

"... He was taller than others and his voice reached the people
as a trumpet, and his face was like the face of Joseph, whom
the Egyptian Pharaoh placed as next to the king after him of
Egypt. His power was a part of the power of Samson and
God gave him the wisdom of Solomon ... this Prince Alexander: he
used to defeat but was never defeated ..."

Born in Pereslavl-Zalessky, Alexander was the second son of Prince Yaroslav Vsevolodovich and Feodosia Igorevna of Ryazan. His maternal grandfather was Igor Glebovich, the second son of Gleb Rostislavich, Prince of Ryazan (d. 1178). His maternal grandmother was Agrafena of Kiev, daughter of Rostislav I of Kiev.

Reign

Prince of Novgorod

In 1236, Alexander was appointed by the Novgorodians to become prince (knyaz) and military leader of the Republic of Novgorod, to defend their northwest lands from Swedish and German invaders.

According to the Novgorod Chronicle written in the 14th century, more than a century after the events it records, the Swedish army landed at the confluence of the rivers Izhora and Neva, when Alexander and his small army suddenly attacked the Swedes on 15 July 1240 and defeated them. The Battle of the Neva saved Novgorod from a full-scale invasion from the West. Because of this battle, 19-year-old Alexander gained the sobriquet "Nevsky" (which means of Neva). This victory, coming just three years after the disastrous Mongol invasion of the Rus' lands of the North West, strengthened Alexander's political influence, but at the same time it worsened his relations with the boyars. He would soon have to leave Novgorod because of this conflict.

After crusading Catholic Germans and Estonians under the Livonian Order invaded Pskov, the Novgorod authorities sent for Alexander. In the spring of 1241, he returned from exile, gathered an army, and drove out the invaders. Alexander and his men faced the Livonian heavy cavalry led by the bishop of Dorpat (Hermann, brother of Albert of Buxhoeveden). Nevsky's army met the enemy on the ice of Lake Peipus and defeated the German knights and the Estonian infantry during the Battle on the Ice on 5 April 1242.

After the Livonian invasion, Nevsky continued to strengthen the Republic of Novgorod. He sent his envoys to Norway and, as a result, they signed a first peace treaty between Novgorod and Norway in 1251. Alexander led his army to Finland and successfully routed the Swedes, who had made another attempt to block the Baltic Sea from the Novgorodians in 1256.

Grand Prince of Vladimir
Upon the conquest of the Principality of Vladimir by the Mongols in 1238, its reigning Prince, Yuri II Vsevolodovich, was killed in the Battle of the Sit River; his younger brother, Yaroslav II Vsevolodovich, requested from, and received from, the Mongol khan installation as the new Prince. As Prince, he assigned the duchy of Novgorod to his son Alexander. However, while traveling in 1245 to the Mongol capital Karakorum in Central Asia, Yaroslav died. When in 1248 Alexander and his older brother Andrey II Yaroslavich also traveled to Karakorum to attend upon the Great Khan, Andrei returned with the award of the Grand Principality of Vladimir and Alexander the nominal lordship of Kiev.

Once Möngke became the new Great Khan in 1251, all the Russian princes were obliged to travel to Sarai on the Volga, the capital of the Golden Horde, to be affirmed in their duchies, but Andrei refused to go. Thanks to his friendship with Sartaq Khan, the subsequent invasion by the Mongol Golden Horde saw Andrei exiled to Sweden and Alexander installed as the Grand Prince of Vladimir (i.e., the supreme Russian ruler) in 1252. Alexander faithfully supported Mongol rule within his domains.  In 1259 he led an army to the city of Novgorod and forced it to pay tribute it had previously refused to the Golden Horde.

Some historians see Alexander's choice of subordination to the Golden Horde as an important reaffirmation of East Slavs' Orthodox orientation (begun under Duke Vladimir of Kiev and his mother Olga).

Death and burial

On 14 November 1263, while returning in 1263 from Sarai on one of his frequent visits to the Horde, Alexander died in the town of Gorodets-on-the-Volga. On 23 November 1263, he was buried in the church of the Monastery of the Nativity of the Holy Mother of God in Vladimir.

From the Second Pskovian Chronicle:

"Returning from the Golden Horde, the Great Prince Alexander,
reached the city of Nizhny Novgorod, and remained there
for several days in good health, but when he reached the
city of Gorodets he fell ill ...

Great Prince Alexander, who was always firm in his faith in
God, gave up this worldly kingdom ... And then he gave up
his soul to God and died in peace on 12 November [1263], on
the day when the Holy Apostle Philip is remembered ...

At this burial Metropolitan Archbishop Cyril said, 'My
children, you should know that the sun of the Suzdalian land
has set. There will never be another prince like him in the
Suzdalian land.'

And the priests and deacons and monks, the poor and
the wealthy, and all the people said: 'It is our end.' "

Veneration and sainthood

The veneration of Alexander began almost immediately after his burial, when he reportedly extended his hand for the prayer of absolution. According to Orthodox tradition, Alexander foresaw his death and before this took strict Orthodox Christian monastic vows, called Great Schema, and took the name Alexey.

In 1380, Alexander's remains were uncovered in response to a vision before the Battle of Kulikovo and found to be incorrupt. The relics were then placed in a shrine in the church. Alexander was canonized as a saint of the Russian Orthodox Church by Metropolitan Macarius in 1547.

In 1695, a new wooden reliquary was made in Moscow in 1695 and the relics placed in it in 1697. By order of Peter the Great the relics were then removed from Vladimir on 11 August 1723 and transported to Shlisselburg, arriving there on 20 September. There they were kept until 1724, when they were brought to Saint Petersburg and installed in the Annunciation Church of the Alexander Nevsky Lavra on 30 August.

With the completion of the Holy Trinity Cathedral of the Alexander Nevsky Lavra in 1790, the shrine and relics were transferred there at its consecration on 30 August, one of the saint's feast days.

In May 1922, during the general confiscation of Russian Orthodox Church property, the shrine was opened. The elaborate silver shrine was transferred to the Hermitage Museum, where it remains. The relics were put into storage at the Museum of the History of Religion and Atheism, before being returned to the Holy Trinity Cathedral in 1989.

Alexander's principal feast day is 23 November. A second feast day was instituted on 30 August in commemoration of the placing of his relics in the Annunciation Church. He is also commemorated in common with other saints of Rostov and Yaroslavl on 23 May.

Marriage and children

According to the Novgorod First Chronicle, Alexander married first a daughter of Bryacheslav Vasilkovich, Prince of Polatsk and Vitebsk, in 1239. Her name is not given in the chronicle. Genealogies name her as Paraskeviya or Alexandra (possibly birth and marital names respectively). They had five children:

Vasily Alexandrovich, Prince of Novgorod (c. 1239–1271). He was betrothed to Princess Kristina of Norway in 1251. The marriage contract was broken. Kristina went on to marry Felipe of Castile, a son of Ferdinand III of Castile and Elisabeth of Hohenstaufen.
Eudoxia Alexandrovna. Married Konstantin Rostislavich, Prince of Smolensk.
Dmitry of Pereslavl (c. 1250–1294).
Andrey of Gorodets (c. 1255 – 27 July 1304).

He married a second wife named Vasilisa or Vassa shortly before his death. They had one son.
Daniel of Moscow (1261 – 4 March/5 March 1303).

Legacy 

Some of Alexander's policies on the Western border were continued by his grandson-in-law, Daumantas of Pskov, who was also beatified in the 16th century. In the late 13th century, a chronicle was compiled called the Life of Alexander Nevsky (Житие Александра Невского), in which he is depicted as an ideal prince-soldier and defender of Russia.

On 21 May 1725, the empress Catherine I introduced the Imperial Order of St. Alexander Nevsky as one of the highest decorations in the land. During World War II, on 29 July 1942, the Soviet authorities introduced an Order of Alexander Nevsky to revive the memory of Alexander's struggle with the Germans. There was also an earlier Bulgarian Order dedicated to Saint Alexander which was founded on 25 December 1881, which ceased to exist when the People's Republic was declared on 16 September 1946.

In 1938, Sergei Eisenstein made one of his most acclaimed films, Alexander Nevsky, about Alexander's victory over the Teutonic Knights. The soundtrack for the film was written by Sergei Prokofiev, who also reworked the score into a concert cantata. Today the film is renowned for its extraordinary battle on ice sequence, which has served as inspiration for countless other films. In the picture, Nevsky used a number of Russian proverbs, tying Nevsky firmly to Russian tradition. The famous proverbial phrase (paraphrasing Matthew 26:52), "Whoever will come to us with a sword, from a sword will perish," is a phrase that is often attributed to Alexander Nevsky, though it was not in fact said by him; it comes from Eisenstein's film, where it was said by actor Nikolai Cherkasov.

There is a long tradition of Russian naval vessels bearing Nevsky's name, such as the 19th-century propeller frigate Alexander Nevsky and K-550 Alexander Nevsky, a nuclear powered ballistic missile submarine currently in service with the Russian Navy.
 
Alexander Nevsky's fame has spread beyond the borders of Russia, and numerous cathedrals and churches are dedicated to him, including the Patriarchal Cathedral in Sofia, Bulgaria; the Cathedral church in Tallinn, Estonia; the Cathedral church in Łódź, Poland; the Alexander Nevsky Cathedral in Ungheni, Moldova.

On 24 September 2008, Alexander Nevsky was declared the main hero of Russia's history by popular vote, as reported by the Kommersant newspaper. In December 2008, he was voted the greatest Russian in the Name of Russia television poll.

During the 2021 Moscow Victory Day Parade, a small historical segment of the parade featured Russian soldiers dressed in historical M1945 Red Army uniforms carrying out the soviet combat banners which received the Order of Alexander Nevsky during the war. This segment coincided with the 800th anniversary since the birth of Alexander Nevsky in 1221 AD.

See also
 Life of Alexander Nevsky (illuminated manuscript)
 Alexander Nevsky Cathedral—an incomplete listing of Eastern Orthodox cathedrals which bear his name
 Rulers of Russia family tree

References

Further reading

 
 Isoaho, Mari. The Image of Aleksandr Nevskiy in Medieval Russia: Warrior and Saint (The Northern World; 21). Leiden: Brill Academic Publishers, 2006 (hardcover).
 "Tale of the Life and Courage of the Pious and Great Prince Alexander [Nevsky]" in Medieval Russia's Epics, Chronicles, and Tales, ed. Serge Zenkovsky, 224–235 (New York: Meridian, 1974)

External links

Repose of Saint Alexander Nevsky Orthodox icon and synaxarion (23 November)
Alexander Nevsky: politics under Mongol domination.
Synaxis of the Saints of Rostov and Yaroslavl (23 May)
Translation of the relics of Saint Alexander Nevsky (30 August)
 Saint Alexander on Nevsky Prospekt.
 
Kommersant: Russia’s Hero is Grand Prince Alexander Nevsky (24 September 2008)
Interfax news agency: Orthodox believers found heaven guardians for Russian secret service (22 September 2008)

 
People from Pereslavl-Zalessky
13th-century Christian saints
Grand Princes of Vladimir
People of the Northern Crusades
Rurik dynasty
Yurievichi family
13th-century princes in Kievan Rus'
Eastern Orthodox royal saints
Princes of Novgorod
Russian saints of the Eastern Orthodox Church
1220 births
1263 deaths